Holothuria (Microthele) nobilis, the black teatfish, is a species of sea cucumber in the genus Holothuria. The cucumber is found in the tropical waters of the Indo-pacific ocean. It was first described by Emil Selenka in 1867.

Description
The cucumber inhabits shallow waters near islands and reefs. Members of the species are blackish-brown and grey in color, and mature adults can weight between 1.7 and 4 kilograms.

Use as food 
Like the related white teatfish, the black teatfish is part of a commercial fishery across its range and the cucumber is regularly consumed as a food. The species can be collected off the seafloor using diving suits or while skindiving, making the species very vulnerable to overfishing. The species is considered endangered in the Indian Ocean.

References

Holothuriidae
Sea cucumbers as food